Childhood sweetheart is a reciprocating phrase for a relationship (but not a partnership) between young persons. This may come about by an extension of friendship, physical attraction or develop from natural affinity.

The relationship is usually platonic and lasts a short to medium period of time. This experience forms the basis of subsequent future relationships later in childhood and/or adulthood. Usually, an individual will have no more than one childhood sweetheart as this term is indicative of a milestone in the growth, development and maturity of a young person. In ideal circumstances, the term applies mutually to both parties and corresponds both ways, hence the plural being childhood sweethearts.

The relationship may involve romantic love or may be an extension of a close friendship. Often, intimacy by way of kissing will occur in order to show affection. This is in addition to hugging/cuddling, holding hands, etc. The term "first love" may also apply in certain situations.

Occasionally in later years, these friendships are "rekindled" following separations or passing of their adult partners which lead to a later life marriage, union etc. These instances are notable as they are made popular by media coverage.

Popular culture
Sune Andersson and Sophie Blixt from the Sune book series.

See also
Courtship
Dating
Friendship
Infatuation
Limerence
Puppy love
Romantic friendship

References

Sweetheart
Dating